Frank Sydenham Nash (17 March 1907 – 2 December 1992) was an Australian rules footballer who played with Essendon in the Victorian Football League (VFL).

Nash later served in the Australian Army for six months during World War II.

Notes

External links 

Frank Nash's profile at Australianfootball.com

1907 births
1992 deaths
Australian rules footballers from Victoria (Australia)
Essendon Football Club players